The 1994 Ibero-American Championships in Athletics (Spanish: VI Campeonato Iberoamericano de Atletismo) was the sixth edition of the international athletics competition between Ibero-American nations which was held at the Estadio José María Minella in Mar del Plata, Argentina from 27–30 October.

The competition marked the inauguration of a newly built track at the host stadium, which was part of Mar del Plata's developments for the 1995 Pan American Games. Due to its late scheduling in the annual track and field season, the competition did not attract some of the region's top athletes – Cuba, Portugal and Spain all sent less than full strength delegations. As a result, Brazil topped the medal table for the second time in Ibero-American history, taking eleven gold medals and 32 in total. Cuba were the next best performers with eight golds in their haul of 20 medals, while Colombia came third, having won seven events and 17 medals overall. The hosts, Argentina, were fourth with four golds and fifteen medals in total.

Four new championship records were set at the 1994 edition. Ronaldo da Costa improved the men's 5000 metres record, but was beaten in the 10,000 metres by Armando Quintanilla, who took over half a minute off the previous record. Andrés Charadía bettered a men's hammer throw record, while María Eugenia Villamizar set a new standard in the inaugural women's hammer event. Sueli dos Santos won the women's javelin with a South American record throw, but this mark was later removed as she was disqualified for doping.

Outside of these performances, the standard of competition was lower than at previous editions. Carlos Gats won the men's 100 metres with a slow, wind-assisted time of 10.50 seconds to become the first Argentine to win an international 100 m race since Gerardo Bönnhoff in 1947. Sebastián Keitel of Chile completed a men's 200/400 m double, while Colombia's Ximena Restrepo achieved the same feat and also won in both relays, taking four gold medals from the championships. Andrea Ávila won golds in the women's long jump and triple jump and went on to medal in both the horizontal jumps at the 1995 Pan American Games. Brazilian Silvana Pereira also won two golds, taking the titles in both the long-distance track events.

Medal summary

Men

Women

† = Sueli dos Santos's javelin throw of 65.96 m was a championship and South American record, but this was later annulled due to a doping infraction in the months following the tournament. The Ibero-American Athletic Association did not retrospectively adjust or re-issue the women's javelin medals.

Medal table

Participation
Twenty-two nations of the Asociación Iberoamericana de Atletismo sent delegations to the 1994 championships.  A total of 346 athletes took part in the competition.  However, only 299 participating athletes were counted by analysing the official result list. The higher number probably contains coaches and/or officials registered for the event.

 (49)
 (4)
 (47)
 (18)
 (18)
 (1)
 (29)
 (1)
 (6)
 (1)
 (5)
 (1)
 (36)
 (1)
 (1)
 (4)
 (13)
 (11)
 (4)
 (25)
 (19)
 (5)

References

Results
Ibero American Championships. GBR Athletics. Retrieved on 2011-12-02.
El Atletismo Ibero-Americano - San Fernando 2010 (pgs. 129–140). RFEA. Retrieved on 2011-12-02.

Ibero-American Championships in Athletics
Ibero-American Championships
1994 in Argentine sport
Sport in Mar del Plata
International athletics competitions hosted by Argentina
October 1994 sports events in South America